Alisa Solomon (was born in 1956) He is a writer, Professor of Journalism, and the Director of the Arts and Culture concentration at the Columbia Journalism School. Solomon served as a story consultant for the documentary on the musical Fiddler on the Roof titled Fiddler: A Miracle of Miracles. Solomon has written two award-winning books: Re-Dressing the Canon: Essays on Theater and Gender and Wonder of Wonders: A Cultural History of Fiddler on the Roof. Additionally, she has served as a reporter for many publications, some of which including: The Village Voice, The New York Times, The Nation, and other publications.

Education 
Solomon earned her BA, with a double major in Drama and Philosophy, at the University of Michigan's Residential College in Ann Arbor, Michigan. She then went on to earn her MFA and Doctorate, in Dramaturgy and Criticism, at the Yale School of Drama in New Haven, Connecticut.

Career 
Solomon first's book, Re-Dressing the Canon: Essays on Theater and Gender, explores gender and performance and was published in 1997. It won the George Jean Nathan Award for Dramatic Criticism. Her second book, Wonder of Wonders: A Cultural History of Fiddler on the Roof, discussed the making of the musical Fiddler on the Roof and shows the evolution of Jewish cultural identity. This book, published in 2013, won the Kurt Weill Prize, the Jewish Journal Prize, and the Theatre Library Association's George Freedley Memorial Award. Solomon has also been an editor of a number of books as well as a special issue of the journal Theater on theater and social change.

Solomon served as a story consultant for the documentary on the musical Fiddler on the Roof titled Fiddler: A Miracle of Miracles. This documentary goes into the creation and significance of the play, featuring interviews with the Fiddler creators and others from the musical.

Solomon is a teacher at Columbia University's Graduate School of Journalism, and at this university she directs the MA program's Arts & Culture concentration.

Solomon has served as a reporter for the Village Voice from 1983 to 2004, as well as having contributed to: The New York Times newspaper, The Nation newspaper, Tablet newspaper, The Forward newspaper, Howlround.com non-profit service organization, killingthebuddha.com online journal, American Theater magazine, TDR – The Drama Review journal, and others.

Awards 
In 1997, Solomon won the George Jean Nathan Award for Dramatic Criticism for her book Re-Dressing the Canon: Essays on Theater and Gender. In 2014, she won the Theatre Library Association's George Freedly Memorial Award for her book Wonder of Wonders: A Cultural History of Fiddler on the Roof. In 2015, she won The Kurt Weill Prize for her book Wonder of Wonders: A Cultural History of Fiddler on the Roof.

Works

Author 

 Solomon, Alisa (2013). Wonder of Wonders: A Cultural History of Fiddler on the Roof. New York: Metropolitan Books. .
Won a Theatre Library Association's George Freedly Memorial Award.
Won a Kurt Weill Prize.
 Solomon, Alisa (1997). Re-Dressing the Canon: Essays on Theater and Gender. Routledge. .
Won a George Jean Nathan Award for Dramatic Criticism award.

Editor 

 Solomon et al. (2019). Women Mobilizing Memory, published by the Columbia University Press. .
 Solomon et al. (2011). The Reverend Billy Project: From Rehearsal Hall to Super-Mall with the Church of Life After Shopping, published by the University of Michigan Press. .
Solomon et al. (2009). Theater and Social Change, published by Duke University Press Books. .
 Solomon, Alisa; Kushner, Tony (2003). Wrestling with Zion: Progressive Jewish-American Responses to the Israeli-Palestinian Conflict, published by the Grove Press. .
 Solomon, Alisa; Minwalla, Framji (2002). The Queerest Art: Essays on Lesbian and Gay Theater, published by the New York University Press. .

References 

1956 births
Living people
American women writers
American journalists
Columbia University Graduate School of Journalism faculty
21st-century American women